Zieria covenyi, commonly known as the Coveny's zieria, is a plant in the citrus family Rutaceae and is endemic to a small area in the Blue Mountains of New South Wales. It is an erect shrub which multiples asexually from root suckers and has three-part, clover-like leaves and clusters of white to pink flowers with four petals and four stamens.

Description
It has star-shaped hairs on its branches and leaves, at least when they are young. The leaflets are dark green with small oil glands on the upper surface and grey-green with soft hairs on the lower surface.

White to pale pink flowers,  in diameter are arranged in clusters of between 3 and 21 in leaf axils. The clusters are about the same length as the leaves. Flowering occurs from October to December and although insects have been observed visiting the flowers they have not carried fertile pollen from this species and fruit has not been recorded.

Taxonomy and naming
Covenyi's zieria was first formally described in 2002 by James Andrew Anderson from a specimen collected near Bomaderry Creek. The description was published in Australian Systematic Botany. The specific epithet (covenyi) honours the Australian herbarium collector, Robert George Coveny who, with James Armstrong, collected the type specimen.

Distribution and habitat
Zieria covenyi is only known from two populations totalling about 270 plants on Narrow Neck Peninsula in the Blue Mountains, where it grows in sandy soil in eucalypt woodland.

Conservation
Covenyi's zieria is listed as "Endangered" under the New South Wales Threatened Species Conservation Act and under the Commonwealth Government Environment Protection and Biodiversity Conservation Act 1999 (EPBC) Act. Some of the threats to the species are habitat damage due to road maintenance, frequent fires and the inability of the species to reproduce from seed.

References

covenyi
Sapindales of Australia
Flora of New South Wales
Plants described in 2002